67 Cancri is a wide binary star system in the zodiac constellation of Cancer, located 195 light years away from the Sun. It is just visible to the naked eye as a faint, white-hued star with a combined apparent magnitude of 6.07. The binary nature of this system was discovered by James South and John Herschel. They are moving further from the Earth with a heliocentric radial velocity of +12 km/s.

The primary, designated component A, is an A-type main-sequence star with a stellar classification of A8 Vn. The 'n' notation indicates "nebulous" lines due to rapid rotation. It is a shell star, with weak shell lines of singly-ionized titanium being detected in the near ultraviolet in 1970. These may have come from a sporadic mass loss event. Uesugi and Fukuda (1970) gave a projected rotational velocity estimate of 105 km/s for the star, although Abt et al. (1997) suggested it could be as high as 205 km/s.

67 Cancri A is about 867 million years old with 1.89 times the mass of the Sun and 1.90 times the Sun's radius. It is radiating 10.5 times the Sun's luminosity from its photosphere at an effective temperature of 7,982 K.

References

A-type main-sequence stars
Shell stars
Binary stars
Cancer (constellation)
Durchmusterung objects
Cancri, 67
077190
044342
3589